Gabriel Tătaru (born 14 July 1977) is a Romanian bobsledder. He competed in the two man event at the 1998 Winter Olympics.

References

1977 births
Living people
Romanian male bobsledders
Olympic bobsledders of Romania
Bobsledders at the 1998 Winter Olympics
Sportspeople from Pitești